Kristina Lennox-Silva (born April 24, 1985 in Fort Lauderdale, Florida) is a female freestyle and butterfly swimmer from Puerto Rico, who was born in the United States. During her college career she swam for Villanova University and was a multiple time Big East finalist as well earning her All-Big East status. She represented Puerto Rico at the 2008 Summer Olympics in Beijing, China and 2009 World Aquatics Championships in Rome, Italy. She is the sister of Douglas Lennox-Silva, who also competed as a swimmer at the 2008 Summer Olympics and 2009 World Championships.

Kristina graduated from Villanova University majoring in communications and Spanish.

References
 Profile
 Villanova Profile

1985 births
Living people
Female butterfly swimmers
Puerto Rican female freestyle swimmers
Puerto Rican female swimmers
Swimmers at the 2008 Summer Olympics
Olympic swimmers of Puerto Rico
Sportspeople from Fort Lauderdale, Florida